Parmelia ernstiae is a species of foliose lichen in the family Parmeliaceae. It occurs in Europe.

Taxonomy
The lichen was described as a new species in 2002 by lichenologists Tassilo Feuerer and Arne Thell. The type specimen was collected from the trunk of European ash (Fraxinus excelsior) in Germany. It is a member of the Parmelia saxatilis species complex; it can be distinguished from that species by its strongly pruinose thallus and isidia. Another member of this complex is Parmelia serrana.

Distribution
First reported in Germany, Parmelia ernstiae has since been recorded Fennoscandia, including Denmark, southern Finland, and southwestern Sweden. It was reported as new to Norway in 2019, the same year it was reported from Belarus. The eastern limits of its distribution extend to Bosnia-Herzegovina, the Czech Republic, and eastern Germany. Parmelia ernstiae typically grows on tree bark, although a single specimen from Denmark has been found growing on rock. Other than the substrate, it is morphologically and chemically identical to individuals that grow on bark.

Description
The thallus of Parmelia ernstiae comprises small rounded lobes that rarely overlap each other. In the central parts of the thallus, the lobes are intermixed with isidia. The thallus has a pruinose coating, which helps to distinguish it from P. saxatilis. The lobes of the lookalike Parmelia serrana are larger than those of P. ernstiae, and typically overlap.

Chemistry
Several secondary chemicals have been identified in Parmelia ernstiae, including: salazinic acid (a major compound), atranorin, chloroatranorin, consalazinic acid, lobaric acid, lichesterinic acid, protolichesterinic acid, nephrosterinic acid, and isonephrosterinic acid (all minor compounds). Parmelia ernstiae has the largest set of secondary chemicals in the Parmelia saxatilis group, and can be distinguished from those lookalikes by its secondary chemical composition.

References

ernstiae
Lichen species
Lichens described in 2002
Lichens of Europe